Thomas William Downes (18 February 1868 – 6 August 1938) was a New Zealand historian, ethnologist and river works supervisor. 

Downes was born in Wellington, New Zealand, on 18 February 1868. His family moved to Bulls in the 1870s and he went to school there. He married Margaret  Thomson there in May 1890. They moved to Wanganui in 1898. He died in Wanganui on 6 August 1938, survived by Margaret and their married daughter.

References

1868 births
1938 deaths
20th-century New Zealand historians
New Zealand ethnologists
19th-century New Zealand historians